The Queensland Women's Rugby League is the governing body of female rugby league in Queensland.  It is a member of the Australian Women's Rugby League and Queensland Rugby League. The organisation is responsible for administering the Queensland Women's rugby league team and Brisbane and District Women's Rugby League competition.

Clubs
Beerwah Women's Rugby League Club
Browns Plains Bears Women's Rugby League Club
Burleigh Heads Bears
Burpengary Women's Rugby League Club
Cannon Hill Stars Women's Rugby League Club
Carina Tigers Women's Rugby League Club
Normanby Women's Rugby League Club
Northern Suburbs Ipswich Women's Rugby League Club
Pine Rivers Women's Rugby League Club
Southern Suburbs Women's Rugby League Club
Sunshine Coast Sirens
Springfield Panthers Women's Rugby League Club
Souths Logan Women's Rugby League Club
Swifts RLFC
Toowoomba Fillies
Waterford RLFC
Wests Inala FC 
Wynnum Manly Women's Rugby League Club

See also

Rugby league in Queensland
New South Wales Women's Rugby League
Western Australian Women's Rugby League

References

External links
 
 

Queensland Rugby League
Women's rugby league governing bodies in Australia